High-definition television (HDTV) in the United States was introduced in 1998 and has since become increasingly popular and dominant in the television market. Hundreds of HD channels are available in millions of homes and businesses both terrestrially and via subscription services such as satellite, cable and IPTV. HDTV has quickly become the standard, with about 85% of all TVs used being HD as of 2018. In the US, the 720p and 1080i formats are used for linear channels, while 1080p is available on a limited basis, mainly for pay-per-view and video on demand content. Some networks have also began transmitting content at 1080p via ATSC 3.0 multiplex channels, with CBS and NBC affiliates being the main stations that transmit at 1080p.

Proposals and introduction
The Federal Communications Commission (FCC) began soliciting proposals for a new television standard for the U.S. in the late 1980s and later decided to ask companies competing to create the standard to pool their resources and work together, forming what was known as the Grand Alliance in 1993.

On July 23, 1996, WRAL-TV (the then CBS affiliate in Raleigh, North Carolina; now affiliated with NBC) became the first television station in the United States to broadcast a digital television signal.

HDTV sets became available in the U.S. in 1998 and broadcasts began around November 1998. The first public HDTV broadcast was of the launch of the Space Shuttle Discovery and John Glenn's return to space; that broadcast was made possible in part by the Harris Corporation. The first commercial broadcast of a local sporting event in HD was during Major League Baseball's Opening Day on March 31, 1998, the Texas Rangers against the Chicago White Sox from The Ballpark in Arlington in Arlington, TX. The telecast was produced by LIN Productions, and overseen by LIN Productions president and Texas Rangers television executive producer Lee Spieckerman. The game was also the inaugural telecast on the digital channel of Dallas/Fort Worth, Texas NBC affiliate KXAS channel 5. The event was simultaneously shown via satellite at a reception attended by members of congress, the FCC and members of the industry in Washington, DC. This telecast was also the first commercial HD broadcast in the state of Texas. The first major sporting event broadcast nationwide in HD was Super Bowl XXXIV, broadcast by ABC on January 30, 2000. By the 2014–15 season every network show producing new episodes had transitioned to high definition.

Satellite and cable

Satellite television companies in the United States, such as Dish Network and DirecTV, started to carry HD programming in 2003. Satellite transmissions in the U.S. use various forms of PSK modulation. A separate tuner is required to receive HD satellite broadcasts.

Cable television companies in the U.S. generally prefer to use 256-QAM to transmit HDTV. Many of the newer HDTVs with integrated digital tuners include support for decoding 256-QAM in addition to 8VSB for OTA digital. Cable television companies started carrying HDTV in 2003.

Currently, HD programming is carried by all major television networks in nearly all DMAs, including ABC, CBS, NBC, FOX, PBS, The CW, MyNetworkTV and Telemundo; and on many independent stations.  All but a select few of cable networks offer an HD broadcast to cable and satellite companies.

HD programming on broadcast and premium networks such as HBO and Showtime had Dolby Digital 5.1.

List of current American high-definition channels

See also

 Big Three television networks
 Cable television in the United States
 Communications in the United States
 Fourth television network
 List of television stations in the United States
 List of United States pay television channels
 List of United States over-the-air television networks
 List of United States television markets
 Satellite television in the United States
 Television in the United States
 Television news in the United States
 United States cable news

References

Digital television in the United States
High-definition_television
United States